Saint John is one of Dominica's 10 administrative parishes. It is bordered by St. Andrew to the east, and St. Peter and the Espagnole River to the south. It has an area of 59 km² (22.78 mi²).

6,561 people live in the parish, half of which (2,977) live in the main settlement, Portsmouth (Dominica's second largest town, also called Grand Anse by locals). Glanvilla and Lagoon serve as the town's suburbs.

Other settlements include:
Bornes
Capucin
Clifton
Cottage
Toucari
Tanetane

The highest peak is Morne aux Diables, with a height of 861 m (2827 ft).

Education
St. John is home to Ross University School of Medicine in Picard.

Portsmouth Secondary School, the island's first rural secondary school, opened in St. John in the 1960s.

Notable names
Via Portsmouth, the parish is the birthplace of local historian Lennox Honychurch, and former prime minister Rosie Douglas.

Transportation
St. John shares some of Dominica's best roads with adjacent St. Andrew. In addition, the island's northernmost road, connecting Tanetane with Penville, was opened in 2004.

Prince Rupert Bay, near Portsmouth, has been an often-used stop-over for yachts and cruise ships.

Tourism
The best known tourist attractions in St. John's are the Indian River and the Cabrits National Park, which consists of the Cabrits Peninsula and Fort Shirley. Benjamin's Park is the primary sporting venue and has hosted first-class cricket.

References

 
Parishes of Dominica